Miguel Guante (born August 24, 1984 in Augusta, Georgia) is an American soccer player of Puerto Rican heritage.

Career

College and Amateur
Guante played college soccer at the University of Portland, and played for the Boulder Rapids Reserves in the USL Premier Development League in 2004 and 2005.

Professional
Guante was drafted in the first round (8th overall) of the 2006 MLS Supplemental Draft by FC Dallas.  Dallas waived him in April 2007 and Miami FC of the USL First Division signed him. In 2008, he moved to the Portland Timbers of the USL First Division.

In 2009, Guante signed with Portland's development team, Portland Timbers U23s, for its inaugural campaign in the USL Premier Development League

International
The Puerto Rican Football association called-up Guante for the Puerto Rico national football team that played against Honduras in the 2010 World Cup qualifier.

Personal
Guante is a distant cousin of Vancouver Whitecaps forward Blas Pérez.

References

External links
 Portland Timbers profile

1984 births
Living people
American soccer players
Colorado Rapids U-23 players
FC Dallas players
Association football midfielders
Miami FC (2006) players
Sportspeople from Augusta, Georgia
Portland Pilots men's soccer players
Portland Timbers (2001–2010) players
Portland Timbers U23s players
Puerto Rican footballers
Soccer players from Georgia (U.S. state)
USL First Division players
USL League Two players
FC Dallas draft picks